Gary Barlow OBE (born 20 January 1971 in Frodsham, Cheshire) is an English singer-songwriter, pianist and record producer. He is the lead vocalist and songwriter of the pop group Take That, and is one of the UK's most successful songwriters, having written 13 number 1 singles in the UK to date including Back for Good which went to number 1 in 31 countries across the world.

Barlow has had 20 top 5 singles (14 of which went to number one) and 8 number-one albums selling over 50 million records worldwide and over 7 million concert tickets.

Below is a list of some songs written by Barlow, including collaborations with other songwriters.

References

External links
Gary Barlow's official site

Take That
 
Barlow, Gary